Shanxi Medical University (山西医科大学) is a university in Shanxi, People's Republic of China under the authority of the provincial government.

See also
Shanxi University of Traditional Chinese Medicine

Universities and colleges in Shanxi
Medical schools in China